Vitali Igorevich Seletskiy (born 23 April 1988) is a Russian former professional football player.

Club career
He played two seasons in the Russian Football National League for FC Chita and FC Baikal Irkutsk.

External links
 
 

1988 births
People from Chita, Zabaykalsky Krai
Living people
Russian footballers
Association football midfielders
FC Baikal Irkutsk players
FC Chita players
Sportspeople from Zabaykalsky Krai